Wildwood State Park is a  state park located in Suffolk County, New York.  The park is in the Town of Riverhead on the north shore of Long Island.  The park includes a beach on Long Island Sound.

The park offers a beach, a playground, picnic tables, hiking and biking, fishing, a campground with tent and trailer sites, cross-country skiing, recreation programs and a food concession.

See also
 List of New York state parks

References

External links
 
 New York State Parks: Wildwood State Park
 Wildwood State Park (Wandering Around the Block)

State parks of New York (state)
Robert Moses projects
Long Island Sound
Riverhead (town), New York
Parks in Suffolk County, New York